Colin Walker (7 July 1929 – November 2017) was an English footballer. He was born in Stapleford, England.

Career
Walker started his career with Derby County in October 1946. He went on to play for Gresley Rovers.

Notes

1929 births
2017 deaths
English footballers
Association football midfielders
Derby County F.C. players
Gresley F.C. players
People from Stapleford, Nottinghamshire
Footballers from Nottinghamshire